Amy Bess Williams Miller (May 4, 1912 – February 23, 2003) was an American historian, preservationist, trustee, and civic leader from the cities of Worcester and Pittsfield, Massachusetts. Best known for leading the effort to preserve Hancock Shaker Village on the border of Pittsfield and Hancock, Massachusetts and establish a museum there, she was a major scholar of Shaker history, society, and artifacts. In addition to serving as the Hancock museum's first president, she was president of the Berkshire Athenaeum, member of the Massachusetts Board of Library Commissioners and American Antiquarian Society, and trustee of Berkshire Medical Center, the Berkshire Museum, Miss Hall's School, the Massachusetts Audubon Society, and the Shaker Museum and Library. Miller's published works all deal with Shaker history and society. She wrote four books and co-edited a fifth, contributed an article to The Herbarist, and contributed to numerous exhibits.

Biography 
Amy Bess Williams was born on May 4, 1912, in El Paso, Texas to Dr. Frederick R. Williams and Elizabeth Avery Taft Williams. At the age of five, her family relocated to Worcester, Massachusetts. During the 1920s, Williams gained a reputation as a socialite, and often visited events held by the American Antiquarian Society. She studied at the preparatory schools Bancroft School in Worcester and Miss Hall's School in Pittsfield, and then attended the Sorbonne, where she specialized in art history and architecture. On October 14, 1933, Williams married Lawrence K. "Pete" Miller, who was then editor and publisher of his family's newspaper The Berkshire Eagle. Among the wedding presents the couple received was a table made by the Shakers, an American Christian sect. This gift is credited with sparking Miller's lifelong interest in the Shakers.

In 1944, Miller became president of the Berkshire Athenaeum, a public library in Pittsfield, holding that position until 1979. In the late 1950s she led a project to preserve what remained of the Hancock Village, as the few remaining Shakers there planned to leave. The project resulted in the transformation of the Village into a museum, which opened in 1960. Miller served as president of this museum until 1990. From 1964 to 1970, Miller served on the Massachusetts Board of Library Commissioners, and, in 1972, Miller successfully advocated for the construction of a new library building to house the Berkshire Athenaeum collection. In 1976, she was inducted into the American Antiquarian Society, to which she contributed regularly. She additionally served as a long-term trustee of Berkshire Medical Center,  the Berkshire Museum, Miss Hall's School, the Massachusetts Audubon Society, and the Shaker Museum and Library. She was also the first woman president of the Pittsfield Community Chest.

Miller's husband Lawrence died in 1991. The couple had four children: a daughter Margo and sons Kelton II, Michael, and Mark. Michael and Mark published and edited, respectively, the Eagle until it was sold to MediaNews Group in 1995. Miller died on February 23, 2003, and a memorial service was held at Hancock Shaker Village. Her collection of Shaker furniture was donated to the museum.

Awards 
Miller was awarded honorary degrees from Williams College, North Adams State College, Rhode Island School of Design, and Muhlenberg College. She also received a national preservation award from the Garden Club of America.

Bibliography
 
 
 
  Facsimile reprint with introduction by Miller.

References 

American women historians
20th-century antiquarians
American antiquarians
Historical preservationists
American curators
American women curators
People from El Paso, Texas
People from Worcester, Massachusetts
People from Pittsfield, Massachusetts
University of Paris alumni
1912 births
2003 deaths
Activists from Texas
People from Berkshire County, Massachusetts
Historians from Massachusetts
20th-century American women writers
Collectors of Shaker artifacts
Historians from Texas
21st-century American women